Satyan L. Devadoss is the Fletcher Jones Chair of Applied Mathematics and Professor of Computer Science at the University of San Diego. His research concerns topology and geometry, with inspiration coming from theoretical physics, phylogenetics, and scientific visualization.

Academia
Devadoss graduated as valedictorian from North Central College in 1993. He earned his Ph.D. in mathematics in 1999 from Johns Hopkins University, under the supervision of Jack Morava. He was a Ross assistant professor at the Ohio State University under Ruth Charney and Mike Davis before joining the faculty at Williams College, receiving tenure and promotion to full-professor.  He has held visiting positions at the University of California, Berkeley, the Ohio State University, Harvey Mudd College, the Mathematical Sciences Research Institute, and Stanford University.

Awards
Devadoss is a recipient of the Henry L. Alder National Teaching Award (2007), the Northeastern Sectional Award for Distinguished Teaching (2014), and the Deborah and Franklin Haimo National Teaching Award (2016), all awarded by the Mathematical Association of America.

In 2012, he became an inaugural Fellow of the American Mathematical Society.

Devadoss has also received the Nelson Bushnell Prize (2012) from Williams College, the Young Alumni Award (2008) from North Central College, and the inaugural William Kelso Morrill Award (1995) from the Johns Hopkins University.

Works
In 2017, Devadoss led a team at the University of San Diego to receive a $1,000,000 grant from the Fletcher Jones Foundation for the renovation of his mathematics department.  The centerpiece of this renovation was his Math Studio, a laboratory that focuses on the physical questions surrounding mathematics research.

With Joseph O'Rourke, Devadoss is a coauthor of the textbook Discrete and Computational Geometry (Princeton University Press, 2011).  With Matt Harvey, he is a coauthor of the tradebook Mage Merlin's Unsolved Mathematical Mysteries (MIT Press, 2020).  Devadoss was also recruited by the Great Courses to create the Shape of Nature, a 36-lecture video course focusing on the applications of geometry and topology to the natural world.

He was a cofounder of CereusData, a data visualization company that focuses on storytelling of institutional data.

Devadoss wrote an opinion editorial published by the Los Angeles Times (2021) on the tension between the usefulness and wonder of mathematics.  He also wrote an opinion editorial in the Washington Post (2018) on the nature of mathematics related to the humanities and the arts. It was chosen by the staff editors as one of their favorite opeds of the year.

Artworks
In 2018, he co-led a team in designing, creating, and showcasing a two-ton metal, wood, and acrylic interactive sculpture titled "Unfolding Humanity" for Burning Man.  The 12-foot tall dodecahedral artwork, externally skinned with black panels containing 2240 acrylic windows, with the interior lined with mirrors and large enough to hold 15 people, dealt with unsolved questions in mathematics (unfolding polyhedra) and physics (cosmological shape of the universe).

His collection of paintings, titled "Cartography of Tree Space" (jointly created with San Francisco-based artist Owen Schuh) has been on gallery shows in Berlin  and Pasadena.

References

External links
Home page

Year of birth missing (living people)
Living people
20th-century American mathematicians
21st-century American mathematicians
North Central College alumni
Johns Hopkins University alumni
Williams College faculty
Fellows of the American Mathematical Society
University of San Diego faculty